Dan Sterling is an American screenwriter and television producer who has worked on many successful television shows, including King of the Hill, Kitchen Confidential, The Daily Show, South Park, The Sarah Silverman Program and The Office.

Sterling's script The Interview became famous after it was seen as an act of war by the supreme leader of the Democratic People's Republic of Korea, Kim Jong-un. The Guardians of Peace made terrorist threats of "a 9/11 style attack" against cinemas who planned to screen the film, and also threatened the safety of Sony Pictures employees and their families. As a result of these threats, Sony Pictures initially cancelled the release of The Interview, though it was later given a limited theatrical release, with broad digital release online through a Sony website, Google Play, Microsoft's Xbox Video, and YouTube Movies.

Filmography

Films

Television

References

External links

American television producers
American television writers
Jewish American writers
Living people
American male screenwriters
American male television writers
Year of birth missing (living people)
21st-century American Jews